Psilogobius is a genus of gobies native to the Indian Ocean and the Pacific Ocean.

Species
There are currently three recognized species in this genus:
 Psilogobius mainlandi W. J. Baldwin, 1972 (Mainland's goby)
 Psilogobius prolatus Watson & Lachner, 1985 (Longjaw shrimpgoby)
 Psilogobius randalli (Goren & Karplus, 1983)

References

Gobiidae